Chakri (Urdu :چکری) village is located 43 km south of Rawalpindi city. The tehsil of this village and the district of Rawalpindi is the city. Main is located along the Islamabad to Lahore Motorway.

History of Chakri 
Before 1955, the name of this village was Bataliyan, then most of the people of the Battalions migrated from this village. Passing through the River Sawan from Dheri village, chakra passes through Chakri village. After that people named him Chakri.

Health Facilities 
This village has a Government Hospital for basic health facilities. In the event of a severe illness, people go to major hospitals in Rawalpindi for treatment.

Education 
This village is High on government. And there's a college for the children of the Soldiers. There is also a private SUPERIOR COLLEGE CHAKRI.

References 

Towns in Rawalpindi District